Nicolás Francisco Cristóbal del Campo, Marquis of Loreto (March 12, 1725 – February 17, 1803) was a Spanish politician and soldier who occupied several posts in the Spanish American colonies, mainly in the River Plate area.

Biography
He was born in Seville to Josefa Arcadia Rodríguez and Nicolás Ignacio del Campo y Cuesta, First Marquis of Loreto. His father was of Flemish descent, and his original family name, van der Velde, was Hispanicized to del Campo.

Del Campo was a member of the Seville Economic Society of Friends of the Country, and later joined the Spanish Army. He rose to the rank of brigadier general and participated in the Spanish invasion of Portugal (1762) and the Great Siege of Gibraltar (1779).

The Marquis of Loreto was appointed Viceroy of the Río de la Plata, and served from March 7, 1784, to December 4, 1789; he succeeded Juan José de Vértiz y Salcedo after the latter's resignation.

As with other viceroys, he was a professional military officer but did not have experience in politics in Spanish America before arriving in Buenos Aires. He became an honest and capable administrator, and in 1785 initiated the improvement and expansion of the Real Audiencia de Buenos Aires created in 1783 by his predecessor. He established the subdivisions on Intendancies in the River Plate, instituting eight Intendancies, and a new system of relations between the mayors and the viceroy. Four intendancies were in Upper Peru (La Paz, Potosí, Cochabamba, Charcas, and Paraguay). The other three comprised Buenos Aires and the region south to Patagonia; Córdoba; and Salta, including the present Argentine Northwest.

He fomented the economy in many levels, promoting agriculture and cattle raising, looking for new sources of good quality salts at low cost to facilitate the salting of meat for export. He improved port infrastructure, fought contraband and introduced new policies of pacific co-existence and commerce with the natives. He also granted bereavement benefits for widows and orphans of Navy personnel; the 1785 edict created the first pension system in what today is Argentina.

Virrey Loreto Street, in the Belgrano ward of Buenos Aires is named in his honor.

References

1725 births
1803 deaths
People from Seville
Spanish people of Dutch descent
Spanish generals
Viceroys of the Río de la Plata